Clyde Thomas Lusk, Jr.  (December 20, 1932 – October 23, 2014) was a vice admiral in the United States Coast Guard who served as Vice Commandant from 1988 to 1990. He had been commander of the Commander of the Eighth Coast Guard District, Chief of Operations of the Eighth Coast Guard District, Commanding Officer of the Merchant Marine Inspection Office, and Chief of the Office of Merchant Marine Safety at Coast Guard Headquarters. He is an alumnus of the United States Coast Guard Academy (1954) and Industrial College of the Armed Forces.

His awards include the Distinguished Service Medal, two Legion of Merit Medals,and two Meritorious Service Medals. the Secretary's Award for Service Silver Medal, the Coast Guard Commendation Medal and the Coast Guard Achievement Medal. Lusk was born in Medford, Massachusetts and has six children with his wife, Beverly J. Tasko, who is from Wethersfield, Connecticut. On October 23, 2014, Lusk died at the age of 81 of natural causes.

References

United States Coast Guard admirals
Vice Commandants of the United States Coast Guard
1932 births
2014 deaths